The River Sullane runs from the mountains between County Cork and County Kerry in southern Ireland, near the village of Cúil Aodha. After passing Ballyvourney, it runs through the centre of Macroom, to which it provides drinking water (and occasionally floods). The Sullane is joined by the River Bohill at Ballyvourney, the River Foherish at Clondrohid, about 5 kilometres west of Macroom and the River Launa locally known as "The Launey" one kilometre east of the town. The Sullane joins the River Lee a further kilometre east. It is well stocked with trout, and also contains European perch (200 g average), minnow and a small number of pike.

References

Sullane